Ves is a rural locality (a selo) in Seletskoye Rural Settlement, Suzdalsky District, Vladimir Oblast, Russia. The population was 612 as of 2010. There are 7 streets.

Geography 
Ves is located on the Irmes River, 11 km northwest of Suzdal (the district's administrative centre) by road. Romanovo is the nearest rural locality.

References 

Rural localities in Suzdalsky District
Suzdalsky Uyezd